Elysa Koplovitz Dutton is a veteran film producer and production executive, currently serving as the head of the feature film division of Alloy Entertainment, a creator and producer of youth-oriented content in books, television, and film. The Los Angeles and New York-based production company officially became part of Warner Bros. Television in 2012, which later evolved into WarnerMedia.

Early life and education
Koplovitz Dutton graduated from Brown University with a bachelor of arts in Art/Semiotics.  While at Brown University, she co-created and produced a bi-weekly television soap opera about student life called Sob Story that was nationally syndicated to colleges around the country. She currently serves on the Film Advisory Council for Brown Motion Pictures.

Career
Koplovitz Dutton most recently produced the Netflix film Purple Hearts, based on the Alloy Entertainment novel of the same name. Purple Hearts stars Sofia Carson and Nicholas Galitzine, and is the 7th most popular film on Netflix of all time. It is the first film of 2022 on the platform to break 100 million hours viewed in a single week.

Currently, Koplovitz Dutton is in post-production on Netflix's, You Are So Not Invited to My Bat Mitzvah, starring Adam Sandler and Idina Menzel, and is in production on the Sony/Screen Gems thriller Horrorscope. Both films are based on Alloy Entertainment novels.

Koplovitz Dutton's previous credits include dance comedy hit Work It, for Netflix, which premiered in the streamer's number one spot worldwide; The Sun Is Also a Star (MGM/Warner Bros.); and Everything, Everything, based on the best-selling book by Nicola Yoon, and starring Amandla Stenberg and Nick Robinson (MGM/Warner Bros.). Everything, Everything received two NAACP Image Award nominations and won the Teen Choice Award for Choice Movie Drama. 

In 2022, Koplovitz Dutton was honored in Variety''''s Power of Women issue, recognizing industry change-makers.Koplovitz Dutton has also received the prestigious Reframe Stamp on five separate films, which honors standout gender-balanced film and television projects.

Prior to Alloy, Koplovitz Dutton produced the classic comedy and cult hit Mike Judge-directed Idiocracy, which continues to play at revival houses nationwide and has been ranked #5 on Rolling Stone's Best Comedies of the 21st Century list. Koplovitz Dutton is also a former executive and head of film for MTV Films and Vice President for Twentieth Century Fox. Her long list of credits as an executive include Election, The Fighting Temptations, 200 Cigarettes, The Wood, Beavis and Butt-Head Do America, The Original Kings of Comedy, Varsity Blues, and Like Mike.''

References

External links
 

American film producers
Year of birth missing (living people)
Living people